Rominger is a German surname. It may refer to: 

 Don Rominger (born 1940), American football coach
 Eileen Rominger, American Securities and Exchange Commission official and investor
 Joseph A. Rominger, California State Assemblyman
 Kent Rominger (born 1956), American astronaut and NASA official
 Marcel Rominger (born 1978), American pianist and teacher
 Richard Rominger (1927–2020), American politician
 Rudolf Rominger (1908–1979), Swiss alpine skier
 Tony Rominger (born 1961), Denmark-born Swiss racing cyclist